Mandelson is a surname. Notable persons with this surname include:

Ben Mandelson (born 1953), English world musician
Jill Mandelson, a character in 31 North 62 East
Kimberly Mandelson, a character in 31 North 62 East
Peter Mandelson (born 1953), British Labour politician